Joseph Scofield Ammerman (July 14, 1924 – October 14, 1993) was an American lawyer and politician who served as a Democratic member of the U.S. House of Representatives from Pennsylvania for one term from 1977 to 1979.

Early life 
Joseph Ammerman was born in Curwensville, Pennsylvania. He served in the United States Army from 1943 to 1946. He graduated from Dickinson College in Carlisle, Pennsylvania in 1948 and received his J.D. from the Dickinson School of Law in 1950.

Career 
He was a delegate to Democratic National Convention in 1952. In 1953, he was elected to the position of district attorney of Clearfield County. He was the United States attorney for the Western District of Pennsylvania from 1961 to 1963, and a member of the Pennsylvania State Senate from 1970 to 1977.

In 1976, he was elected as a Democrat to the 95th Congress, but was an unsuccessful candidate for reelection in 1978.

After his term in the House, he served as judge, court of common pleas in Clearfield County, Pennsylvania from 1986 to 1993.

Death and legacy 
Ammerman died on October 14, 1993. In 2009, a portrait of Ammerman was hung in the portrait gallery of the Clearfield County Courthouse.

References

External links

1924 births
1993 deaths
20th-century American lawyers
20th-century American politicians
Dickinson School of Law alumni
Democratic Party members of the United States House of Representatives from Pennsylvania
Democratic Party Pennsylvania state senators
People from Clearfield County, Pennsylvania
United States Attorneys for the Western District of Pennsylvania
20th-century American judges
Judges of the Pennsylvania Courts of Common Pleas
Military personnel from Pennsylvania